The name Siony has been used in the Philippines by PAGASA in the Western Pacific.

 Typhoon Tokage (2004) (T0423, 27W, Siony) – struck Japan.
 Severe Tropical Storm Maysak (2008) (T0819, 24W, Quinta-Siony) – after PAGASA released the final advisory on "Quinta", PAGASA started to reissue advisories on Quinta, however Quinta was renamed as "Siony".
 Severe Tropical Storm Atsani (2020) (T2020, 23W, Siony)

Pacific typhoon set index articles